Joseph Fitch (August 27, 1857 – April 7, 1917) was an American lawyer, politician, and judge from New York.

Life 
Fitch was born on August 27, 1857 in Flushing, New York, the only child of businessman Joseph Fitch and Avis Leggett.

Fitch attended the Flushing Institute. He then went to Swarthmore College in Pennsylvania, graduating from there in 1879. He then studied law in the office of Charles W. Pleasants in New York City from 1881 to 1882. He also attended classes in Columbia Law School. He was admitted to the bar in 1882 and began practicing law in New York City. From 1880 to 1887, he was Second Lieutenant of the Seventeenth Separate Company, New York National Guard. He later became the senior member of the law firm Fitch, Moore & Swan.

In 1885, Fitch was elected to the New York State Assembly as a Democrat, representing the Queens County 1st District. He served in the Assembly in 1886 and 1887. While in the Assembly, he originated and passed a bill that established the Cold Spring Harbor Fish Hatchery. He was a member of the Flushing Board of Education from 1893 until the consolidation of Greater New York. He was also counsel to the Flushing Village Board of Health from its organization in 1891 until the Greater New York consolidation. In the 1894 United States House of Representatives election, he unsuccessfully ran as a Democrat in New York's 1st congressional district. In 1898, he was appointed Deputy Commissioner of Water Supply, Borough of Queens. In 1905, he was assistant District Attorney of Queens County. In 1908, he was appointed City Magistrate.

Fitch was a member of the Freemasons, the Queens County Bar Association, the New York Law Institute, the League of American Wheelman, Phi Beta Kappa, and the New York State Bar Association. He was Episcopalian, and a vestryman in St. George's Church in Flushing. In 1886, he married Annie Loraine Rose. They had two children, Avis Loraine and Dorothea.

Fitch died of acute indigestion at his friend Desmond Nelson's home in Brookhaven, where he was staying while repairs were being made at his summer home in the town, on April 7, 1917. He was buried in Flushing Cemetery.

References

External links 

 The Political Graveyard
 Joseph Fitch at Find a Grave

1857 births
1917 deaths
People from Flushing, Queens
Lawyers from Queens, New York
Politicians from Queens, New York
Swarthmore College alumni
19th-century American lawyers
20th-century American lawyers
19th-century American politicians
Democratic Party members of the New York State Assembly
New York (state) state court judges
20th-century American judges
American Freemasons
20th-century American Episcopalians
Burials at Flushing Cemetery